"I Think They Like Me" is a song by American hip hop group Dem Franchize Boyz. It was released in August 2005 as a single from their self-titled debut album Dem Franchize Boyz. The song's chorus is sampled from their debut single "White Tee".

The single version is the remix version, the "So So Def Remix" featuring Jermaine Dupri, Da Brat and Bow Wow. The remix is featured on their album On Top of Our Game and was released as the first single from the album. It topped the Hip-Hop/R&B chart for three weeks and reached number 15 on the Billboard Hot 100.

Charts

Weekly charts

Year-end charts

References

2005 singles
Dem Franchize Boyz songs
Jermaine Dupri songs
Da Brat songs
Bow Wow (rapper) songs
Song recordings produced by Jermaine Dupri
Songs written by Jermaine Dupri
Songs written by Da Brat
2004 songs